Atrichotoxon is a genus of air-breathing land snails, terrestrial pulmonate gastropod mollusks in the family Helicarionidae.

Species
Species within the genus Atrichotoxon include:

 Atrichotoxon usambarense

References

 
Helicarionidae
Taxonomy articles created by Polbot